The Tunguska Basin is a sedimentary basin, in Siberia.

Geography

Much of the Siberian Traps Large Igneous Province is inside.

It contains a huge untapped coal reserve. Its main settlements there are Norilsk, Igarka, and Yeniseisk. The Tunguska rivers cross the basin. On June 30, 1908, near the Stony Tunguska River  the Tunguska Event took place.

Geology

Boreholes in the Tunguska Basin indicate ubiquitous and abundant sills, which have great lateral extension.

The Tunguska Basin makes up much of the Siberian Craton and has several subbasins.

See also

 Tunguska Plateau

References

External links

 Encyclopedia.com reference
 US Geology reference

Geology of Siberia
Geology of the Sakha Republic